The 2015–16 Sacramento Kings season was the 71st season of the franchise, its 67th season in the National Basketball Association (NBA), and its 31st in Sacramento. It was also their final season playing in the Sleep Train Arena (their home since 1988), as the Kings moved to the new Golden 1 Center in Downtown Sacramento the following season. It was also the final full–season for DeMarcus Cousins played for the Kings' before being traded to the New Orleans Pelicans midway through next season.

Following seven consecutive seasons with fewer than 30 victories, an ignominy previously suffered only by the Vancouver/Memphis Grizzlies franchise between 1995–96 and 2002–03 and by the Kings themselves between 1986–87 and 1993–94, the Kings improved by four wins to finish 33–49. It was the first time since 2004–05 that the Kings were out of the bottom two in the Pacific Division, but the team remained eight wins short of a playoff berth. This season was also the first since 2007-08 where the Kings had won at least 40% of their games and prevented another 50 loss season. Following the season, veteran George Karl was fired as head coach, one game shy of his 2,000th NBA game as head coach, and replaced by Dave Joerger.

Draft picks

Roster

Standings

Regular season game log

|- style="background:#fbb;"
| 1
| October 28
| L.A. Clippers
| 
| DeMarcus Cousins (32)
| DeMarcus Cousins (13)
| Marco Belinelli (7)
| Sleep Train Arena17,458
| 0–1
|- style="background:#bfb;"
| 2
| October 30
| L.A. Lakers
| 
| Cousins & Rondo (21)
| DeMarcus Cousins (11)
| Rajon Rondo (8)
| Sleep Train Arena17,391
| 1–1
|- style="background:#fbb;"
| 3
| October 31
| @ L.A. Clippers
| 
| Rajon Rondo (21)
| Gay, Cousins & Cauley-Stein (9)
| Rajon Rondo (8)
| Staples Center19,060
| 1–2

|- style="background:#fbb;"
| 4
| November 3
| Memphis
| 
| Rudy Gay (19)
| Willie Cauley-Stein (7)
| Rajon Rondo (4)
| Sleep Train Arena17,317
| 1–3
|- style="background:#fbb;"
| 5
| November 4
| @ Phoenix
| 
| Kosta Koufos (16)
| Rudy Gay (8)
| Collison, Rondo (6)
| Talking Stick Resort Arena16,497
| 1–4
|- style="background:#fbb;"
| 6
| November 6
| Houston
| 
| Casspi, Collison (22)
| Willie Cauley-Stein (9)
| Darren Collison (9)
| Sleep Train Arena16,983
| 1–5
|- style="background:#fbb;"
| 7
| November 7
| Golden State
| 
| Rudy Gay (22)
| Rajon Rondo (12)
| Rajon Rondo (15)
| Sleep Train Arena17,317
| 1–6
|- style="background:#fbb;"
| 8
| November 9
| San Antonio
| 
| DeMarcus Cousins (21)
| DeMarcus Cousins (12)
| Rajon Rondo (10)
| Sleep Train Arena17,317
| 1–7
|- style="background:#bfb;"
| 9
| November 11
| Detroit
| 
| DeMarcus Cousins (33)
| Casspi, Rondo (11)
| Rajon Rondo (15)
| Sleep Train Arena17,317
| 2–7
|- style="background:#bfb;"
| 10
| November 13
| Brooklyn
| 
| DeMarcus Cousins (40)
| DeMarcus Cousins (13)
| Rajon Rondo (14)
| Sleep Train Arena17,131
| 3–7
|- style="background:#bfb;"
| 11
| November 15
| Toronto
| 
| DeMarcus Cousins (36)
| DeMarcus Cousins (10)
| Rajon Rondo (14)
| Sleep Train Arena17,006
| 4–7
|- style="background:#fbb;"
| 12
| November 18
| @ Atlanta
| 
| DeMarcus Cousins (24)
| Cousins, Rondo (12)
| Rajon Rondo (12)
| Philips Arena13,008
| 4–8
|- style="background:#fbb;"
| 13
| November 19
| @ Miami
| 
| Marco Belinelli (23)
| Rudy Gay (12)
| Rajon Rondo (18)
| American Airlines Arena19,600
| 4–9
|- style="background:#bfb;"
| 14
| November 21
| @ Orlando
| 
| DeMarcus Cousins (29)
| DeMarcus Cousins (12)
| Rajon Rondo (9)
| Amway Center16,104
| 5–9
|- style="background:#fbb;"
| 15
| November 23
| @ Charlotte
| 
| DeMarcus Cousins (30)
| DeMarcus Cousins (11)
| Rajon Rondo (20)
| Time Warner Cable Arena14,163
| 5–10
|- style="background:#bfb;"
| 16
| November 25
| @ Milwaukee
| 
| Rudy Gay (36)
| Koufos, Rondo (9)
| Rajon Rondo (13)
| BMO Harris Bradley Center14,120
| 6–10
|- style="background:#fbb;"
| 17
| November 27
| Minnesota
| 
| Marco Belinelli (17)
| Kosta Koufos (13)
| Rajon Rondo (16)
| Sleep Train Arena17,317
| 6–11
|- style="background:#fbb;"
| 18
| November 28
| @ Golden State
| 
| Rudy Gay (20)
| Acy, Casspi, Gay, Koufos (7)
| Rajon Rondo (7)
| Oracle Arena19,596
| 6–12
|- style="background:#bfb;"
| 19
| November 30
| Dallas
| 
| DeMarcus Cousins (31)
| DeMarcus Cousins (9)
| DeMarcus Cousins (6)
| Sleep Train Arena16,937
| 7–12

|- style="background:#fbb;"
| 20
| December 3
| Boston
| 
| Rudy Gay (18)
| Kosta Koufos (10)
| Rajon Rondo (8)
| Mexico City Arena(Mexico City, MX/NBA Global Games)18,660
| 7–13
|- style="background:#fbb;"
| 21
| December 5
| @ Houston
| 
| Ben McLemore (19)
| Kosta Koufos (12)
| Rajon Rondo (19)
| Toyota Center17,318
| 7–14
|- style="background:#fbb;"
| 22
| December 6
| @ Oklahoma City
| 
| Rudy Gay (20)
| DeMarcus Cousins (10)
| Rajon Rondo (10)
| Chesapeake Energy Arena18,203
| 7–15
|- style="background:#bfb;"
| 23
| December 8
| Utah
| 
| Cousins, Gay (23)
| DeMarcus Cousins (12)
| Rajon Rondo (13)
| Sleep Train Arena16,505
| 8–15
|- style="background:#bfb;"
| 24
| December 10
| New York
| 
| DeMarcus Cousins (27)
| DeMarcus Cousins (11)
| Rajon Rondo (12)
| Sleep Train Arena17,317
| 9–15
|- style="background:#bfb;"
| 25
| December 15
| Houston
| 
| DeMarcus Cousins (26)
| Rudy Gay (13)
| Darren Collison (13)
| Sleep Train Arena17,317
| 10–15
|- style="background:#fbb;"
| 26
| December 18
| @ Minnesota
| 
| DeMarcus Cousins (24)
| DeMarcus Cousins (11)
| Rajon Rondo (13)
| Target Center12,770
| 10–16
|- style="background:#bfb;"
| 27
| December 20
| @ Toronto
| 
| Gay, Rondo (18)
| Omri Casspi (11)
| Rajon Rondo (13)
| Air Canada Centre19,800
| 11–16
|- style="background:#fbb;"
| 28
| December 21
| @ Washington
| 
| DeMarcus Cousins (22)
| Cousins, Rondo (8)
| Rajon Rondo (9)
| Verizon Center15,124
| 11–17
|- style="background:#bfb;"
| 29
| December 23
| @ Indiana
| 
| DeMarcus Cousins (25)
| DeMarcus Cousins (16)
| Rajon Rondo (16)
| Bankers Life Fieldhouse18,165
| 12–17
|- style="background:#fbb;"
| 30
| December 27
| Portland
| 
| DeMarcus Cousins (36)
| Rudy Gay (14)
| Rajon Rondo (15)
| Sleep Train Arena17,317
| 12–18
|- style="background:#fbb;"
| 31
| December 28
| @ Golden State
| 
| Omri Casspi (36)
| Quincy Acy (10)
| Darren Collison (11)
| Oracle Arena19,596
| 12–19
|- style="background:#fbb;"
| 32
| December 30
| Philadelphia
| 
| DeMarcus Cousins (21)
| Casspi, Cousins (11)
| Rajon Rondo (14)
| Sleep Train Arena17,317
| 12–20

|- style="background:#bfb;"
| 33
| January 2
| Phoenix
| 
| DeMarcus Cousins (32)
| DeMarcus Cousins (9)
| Rajon Rondo (15)
| Sleep Train Arena17,317
| 13–20
|- style="background:#bfb;"
| 34
| January 4
| @ Oklahoma City
| 
| DeMarcus Cousins (33)
| DeMarcus Cousins (19)
| Rajon Rondo (18)
| Chesapeake Energy Arena18,203
| 14–20
|- style="background:#fbb;"
| 35
| January 5
| @ Dallas
| 
| DeMarcus Cousins (35)
| DeMarcus Cousins (17)
| Darren Collison (12)
| American Airlines Center20,059
| 14–21
|- style="background:#bfb;"
| 36
| January 7
| L. A. Lakers
| 
| DeMarcus Cousins (29)
| DeMarcus Cousins (10) 
| Rajon Rondo (12)
| Sleep Train Arena17,386
| 15–21
|-style="background:#fbb;"
| 37
| January 9
| Golden State
| 
| DeMarcus Cousins (33)
| DeMarcus Cousins (10)
| Rajon Rondo (12)
| Sleep Train Arena17,317
| 15–22
|-style="background:#fbb;"
| 38
| January 13
| New Orleans
| 
| DeMarcus Cousins (32)
| DeMarcus Cousins (12)
| Rajon Rondo (10)
| Sleep Train Arena17,317
| 15–23
|-style="background:#bfb;"
| 39
| January 14
| @ Utah
| 
| DeMarcus Cousins (36)
| DeMarcus Cousins (17)
| Rajon Rondo (13)
| Vivint Smart Home Arena17,894
| 16–23
|- style="background:#bfb;"
| 40
| January 16
| @ L. A. Clippers
| 
| DeMarcus Cousins (19)
| DeMarcus Cousins (10)
| Rajon Rondo (10)
| Staples Center19,191
| 17–23
|- style="background:#bfb;"
| 41
| January 20
| @ L. A. Lakers
| 
| DeMarcus Cousins (36)
| DeMarcus Cousins (16)
| Rajon Rondo (17)
| Staples Center18,997
| 18–23
|-style="background:#bfb;"
| 42
| January 21
| Atlanta
| 
| DeMarcus Cousins (24)
| DeMarcus Cousins (15)
| Rajon Rondo (11)
| Sleep Train Arena17,019
| 19–23
|-style="background:#bfb;"
| 43
| January 23
| Indiana
| 
| DeMarcus Cousins (48)
| DeMarcus Cousins (13)
| Rajon Rondo (10)
| Sleep Train Arena17,419
| 20–23
|-style="background:#fbb;"
| 44
| January 25
| Charlotte
| 
| DeMarcus Cousins (56)
| DeMarcus Cousins (12)
| Rajon Rondo (20)
| Sleep Train Arena16,991
| 20–24
|-style="background:#fbb;"
| 45
| January 26
| @ Portland
| 
| DeMarcus Cousins (17)
| Omri Casspi (8)
| Rajon Rondo (11)
| Moda Center19,393
| 20–25
|-style="background:#fbb;"
| 46
| January 28
| @ New Orleans
| 
| Cousins, McLemore (26)
| DeMarcus Cousins (10)
| Rajon Rondo (15)
| Smoothie King Center15,636
| 20–26
|-style="background:#fbb;"
| 47
| January 30
| @ Memphis
| 
| Rudy Gay (21)
| DeMarcus Cousins (14)
| Rajon Rondo (8)
| FedExForum18,119
| 20–27

|-style="background:#bfb;"
| 48
| February 1
| Milwaukee
| 
| Rudy Gay (32)
| Kosta Koufos (12)
| Rajon Rondo (7)
| Sleep Train Arena16,827
| 21–27
|-style="background:#fbb;"
| 49
| February 3
| Chicago
| 
| DeMarcus Cousins (30)
| DeMarcus Cousins (11)
| Rajon Rondo (9)
| Sleep Train Arena17,317
| 21–28
|-style="background:#fbb;"
| 50
| February 5
| @ Brooklyn
| 
| Darren Collison (25)
| DeMarcus Cousins (10)
| Rajon Rondo (15)
| Barclays Center14,432
| 21–29
|-style="background:#fbb;"
| 51
| February 7
| @ Boston
| 
| DeMarcus Cousins (31)
| DeMarcus Cousins (7)
| Rajon Rondo (15)
| TD Garden18,624
| 21–30
|-style="background:#fbb;"
| 52
| February 8
| @ Cleveland
| 
| Casspi, Gay (16)
| Cousins, Rondo (8)
| Rajon Rondo (16)
| Quicken Loans Arena20,562
| 21–31
|-style="background:#bfb;"
| 53
| February 10
| @ Philadelphia
| 
| DeMarcus Cousins (28)
| DeMarcus Cousins (12)
| Rajon Rondo (15)
| Wells Fargo Center12,501
| 22–31
|- align="center"
|colspan="9" bgcolor="#bbcaff"|All-Star Break
|- style="background:#bfb;"
| 54
| February 19
| Denver
| 
| DeMarcus Cousins (37)
| DeMarcus Cousins (20)
| Rajon Rondo (9)
| Sleep Train Arena17,317
| 23–31
|- style="background:#bfb;"
| 55
| February 23
| @ Denver
| 
| DeMarcus Cousins (39)
| Rudy Gay (10)
| Rajon Rondo (12)
| Pepsi Center15,721
| 24–31
|- style="background:#fbb;"
| 56
| February 24
| San Antonio
| 
| DeMarcus Cousins (22)
| DeMarcus Cousins (10)
| Rajon Rondo (18)
| Sleep Train Arena17,317
| 24–32
|- style="background:#fbb;"
| 57
| February 26
| L. A. Clippers
| 
| DeMarcus Cousins (26)
| DeMarcus Cousins (15)
| DeMarcus Cousins (9)
| Sleep Train Arena17,317
| 24–33
|- style="background:#fbb;"
| 58
| February 29
| Oklahoma City
| 
| DeMarcus Cousins (35)
| DeMarcus Cousins (12)
| Rajon Rondo (12)
| Sleep Train Arena17,317
| 24–34

|- style="background:#fbb;"
| 59
| March 2
| @ Memphis
| 
| DeMarcus Cousins (18)
| DeMarcus Cousins (16)
| Rajon Rondo (17)
| FedExForum15,310
| 24–35
|- style="background:#bfb;"
| 60
| March 3
| @ Dallas
| 
| DeMarcus Cousins (22)
| DeMarcus Cousins (13)
| Rajon Rondo (12)
| American Airlines Center19,910
| 25–35
|- style="background:#fbb;"
| 61
| March 5
| @ San Antonio
| 
| DeMarcus Cousins (31)
| DeMarcus Cousins (9)
| Rajon Rondo (8)
| AT&T Center18,418
| 25–36
|- style="background:#fbb;"
| 62
| March 7
| @ New Orleans
| 
| DeMarcus Cousins (40)
| DeMarcus Cousins (16)
| Rajon Rondo (10)
| Smoothie King Center16,403
| 25–37
|- style="background:#fbb;"
| 63
| March 9
| Cleveland
| 
| DeMarcus Cousins (29)
| DeMarcus Cousins (11)
| Darren Collison (8)
| Sleep Train Arena17,317
| 25–38
|- style="background:#fbb;"
| 64
| March 11
| Orlando
| 
| Kosta Koufos (19)
| Rudy Gay (7)
| Rajon Rondo (14)
| Sleep Train Arena17,081
| 25–39
|-style="background:#fbb;"
| 65
| March 13
| Utah
| 
| DeMarcus Cousins (31)
| DeMarcus Cousins (10)
| Darren Collison (9)
| Sleep Train Arena17,023
| 25–40
|- style="background:#bfb;"
| 66
| March 15
| @ L. A. Lakers
| 
| Collison, Cousins (22)
| Cousins, Gay (8)
| Rajon Rondo (12)
| Staples Center18,997
| 26–40
|- style="background:#fbb;"
| 67
| March 16
| New Orleans
| 
| Darren Collison (23)
| DeMarcus Cousins (12)
| Cousins, Curry (5)
| Sleep Train Arena17,086
| 26–41
|- style="background:#fbb;"
| 68
| March 18
| @ Detroit
| 
| DeMarcus Cousins (31)
| DeMarcus Cousins (13)
| Rajon Rondo (10)
| The Palace of Auburn Hills15,982
| 26–42
|- style="background:#bfb;"
| 69
| March 20
| @ New York
| 
| DeMarcus Cousins (24)
| DeMarcus Cousins (20)
| Collison, Rondo (6)
| Madison Square Garden19,812
| 27–42
|-style="background:#fbb;"
| 70
| March 21
| @ Chicago
| 
| Collison, Cousins (19)
| DeMarcus Cousins (18)
| Rajon Rondo (5)
| United Center21,531
| 27–43
|- style="background:#fbb;"
| 71
| March 23
| @ Minnesota
| 
| Rajon Rondo (25)
| Kosta Koufos (15)
| Rajon Rondo (12)
| Target Center12,151
| 27–44
|- style="background:#bfb;"
| 72
| March 25
| Phoenix
| 
| DeMarcus Cousins (29)
| DeMarcus Cousins (11)
| Rajon Rondo (12)
| Sleep Train Arena17,317
| 28–44
|- style="background:#bfb;"
| 73
| March 27
| Dallas
| 
| Willie Cauley-Stein (21)
| DeMarcus Cousins (12)
| Rajon Rondo (11)
| Sleep Train Arena17,147
| 29–44
|- style="background:#fbb;"
| 74
| March 28
| @ Portland
| 
| Seth Curry (21)
| Willie Cauley-Stein (14)
| Darren Collison (7)
| Moda Center19,393
| 29–45
|- style="background:#bfb;"
| 75
| March 30
| Washington
| 
| DeMarcus Cousins (29)
| DeMarcus Cousins (10)
| Rajon Rondo (11)
| Sleep Train Arena17,185
| 30–45

|- style="background:#fbb;"
| 76
| April 1
| Miami
| 
| Darren Collison (26)
| Rudy Gay (13)
| Rajon Rondo (10)
| Sleep Train Arena17,317
| 30–46
|- style="background:#bfb;"
| 77
| April 2
| @ Denver
| 
| Rudy Gay (25)
| Gay, Cauley-Stein (9)
| Darren Collison (8)
| Pepsi Center15,607
| 31–46
|- style="background:#fbb;"
| 78
| April 5
| Portland
| 
| DeMarcus Cousins (30)
| Rajon Rondo (10)
| Rajon Rondo (12)
| Sleep Train Arena17,317
| 31–47
|- style="background:#fbb;"
| 79
| April 7
| Minnesota
| 
| Darren Collison (19)
| Rudy Gay (13)
| Darren Collison (6)
| Sleep Train Arena17,317
| 31–48
|- style="background:#bfb;"
| 80
| April 9
| Oklahoma City
| 
| Darren Collison (27)
| Rudy Gay (8)
| Darren Collison (8)
| Sleep Train Arena17,317
| 32–48
|- style="background:#bfb;"
| 81
| April 11
| @ Phoenix
| 
| Seth Curry (20)
| Kosta Koufos (8)
| Seth Curry (15)
| Talking Stick Resort Arena17,288
| 33–48
|- style="background:#fbb;"
| 82
| April 13
| @ Houston
| 
| Ben McLemore (24)
| Kosta Koufos (11)
| James Anderson (5)
| Toyota Center18,311
| 33–49

Transactions

Trades

Free agents

Re-Signed

Additions

Subtractions

References

Sacramento Kings seasons
Sacramento Kings
Sacramento Kings
Sacramento Kings